Trailing can mean, among others:
 Facing and trailing, in railroads
 The act f using a Trailer (promotion)
 Trailing wheel
 Trailing arm
 Trailing edge
 Hound trailing
 Trailing twelve months